Cylindrocerus is a genus of true weevils in the tribe Apostasimerini. Species are found in the Americas.

References 

 Tabulae synopticae familiae Curculionidum (continuatio). CJ Schoenherr, Isis von Oken, 1825
 Genera et Species Curculionidum VIII, 2. CJ Schoenherr, 1825

External links 

 
 Cylindrocerus at insectoid.info

Baridinae genera